Acinetobacter calcoaceticus is a bacterial species of the genus Acinetobacter. It is a nonmotile, Gram-negative coccobacillus. It grows under aerobic conditions, is catalase positive and oxidase negative. 
A. calcoaceticus is a part of the A. calcoaceticus-A. baumannii complex together with Acinetobacter baumannii, Acinetobacter nosocomialis, Acinetobacter pitti and Acinetobacter seifertii.

Habitat
A. calcoaceticus is a soil bacterium. It has been shown to be prevalent in the tiger mosquito Aedes albopictus microflora.

Metabolism
Phloroglucinol carboxylic acid is a degradation product excreted by A. calcoaceticus grown on (+)-catechin as the sole source of carbon.

Uses
A. calcoaceticus can be used as an alternative to A. baumannii in the laboratory setting. The interchangeability of the two species stems from their extreme degree of similarity and ability to form the A. calcoaceticus-A. baumannii complex. Other contributing factors include the cost-effective nature of A. calcoaceticus compared to A. baumannii and the ability of A. calcoaceticus to readily uptake DNA.

References

External links
 Acinetobacter calcoaceticus on www.ncbi.nlm.nih.gov
Type strain of Acinetobacter calcoaceticus at BacDive -  the Bacterial Diversity Metadatabase

Moraxellaceae